Lebanon-Warren County Airport  is a public airport located three miles (5 km) northwest of the central business district of Lebanon, on Greentree Road, in Warren County, Ohio, United States.

It is a county-owned public airport operated by the Warren County Airport Authority, a board of 9 members appointed by the County Commissioners. The runway, taxiway, and communication and navigation aids are County owned. The Airport Authority leases a terminal for public use on adjacent private property. The hangars, and other airport buildings are privately owned and operated. Daily airport management is handled under contract by fixed-base operator (FBO), Warren County Airport, Ltd.

Facilities

Runway
There is one North-South Runway (01/19). The runway is 4502' x 75' asphalt paved with lighting for night operation. The runway has displaced thresholds on both ends to clear obstructions. Airport elevation is 898'. There is a taxiway parallel to the runway.

Navigation and Communications aids
 MIRL Runway & Taxiway lights
 PCL Pilot Controlled Lighting - Frequency 123.075
 REIL - Runway End Identification Lights
 Rotating beacon - White-Green
 Wind sock near center of runway, between runway and taxiway
 4 light PAPI
 AWOS Automated Weather Observation System - Frequency 120.550, By Phone 513-934-5500
 UNICOM - Frequency 123.075
 Online weather information service in terminal building

Privately operated airport services
 Aviation Fuel
 Hangar Rental
 Pilot training
 Aircraft Rental
 Aircraft Charters
 Warren County Career Center - Aerospace Academy
 Miami Valley Hospital CareFlight helicopter base and helipad
 Home of the USU Wright Flyer replica built for the 100th anniversary of aviation held in 2003 
 Skydiving
 Helicopter Training, rides, photo flights, and other helicopter services 
 Hot air ballooning

Aircraft
For the 12-month period ending December 19, 2006, the airport had 24,951 aircraft operations, an average of 68 per day: 99% general aviation, 1% air taxi and <1% military. There are 104 aircraft based at this airport: 72% single-engine, 26% multi-engine (27) and 2% jet.

Accidents and incidents
 On 18 October 2020, a small plane made an emergency landing while attempting to land at the airport.

See also 
List of airports in Ohio

References

External links 
Airport FBO website
Ohio Department of Transportation - Aviation Division
Online AWOS display

County airports in Ohio
Transportation in Warren County, Ohio
Buildings and structures in Warren County, Ohio
Airports in Ohio